Richard Moore (born 1 December 1991) is a racing driver from New Zealand, who competes in the New Zealand V8SuperTourer Series for M3 Racing, he is the team mate of four-time Bathurst 1000 winner Greg Murphy.

Career

V8 SuperTourers
In 2012 the all new V8SuperTourer category was launched and the Moore family was interested in competing and managed to form a team with Paul Manuell and Greg Murphy to create M3 Racing. In Moore's first season he showed great speed and even managed to land four podium finishes, and then in 2013 Moore was consistently in the top three placings, and ended the season fourth in the championship, including a race victory.

Racing record

Career summary

External links

1991 births
Living people
V8SuperTourer drivers
Australian Endurance Championship drivers
New Zealand racing drivers